Boston Bay may refer to:

Boston Bay, Illinois
Port of Boston, Massachusetts
Boston Harbor, Massachusetts
Boston Bay (South Australia), part of Spencer Gulf
  Boston Bay, Portland Parish, Jamaica

See also
 The Boston Bay State Banner
 Boston Bay College, fictional university in the TV series Dawson's Creek
 "Sailing Down Boston Bay" by Edward Rowe Snow, Yankee Publishing Company, 1941